Carlos Manuel Arana Osorio (July 17, 1918 – December 6, 2003) was President of Guatemala from 1970 to 1974. His government enforced torture, disappearances and killings against political and military adversaries, as well as common criminals.

Arana was born in Barberena, in the department of Santa Rosa. A colonel in the Army, he oversaw counterinsurgency efforts in Zacapa and Izabal, where thousands were killed by the military from 1966 to 1968. In July 1970 he became president following an electoral process generally considered "non-transparent" on a platform promising a crackdown on law-and-order issues and stability; his vice president was Eduardo Cáceres.

In November 1970, Arana imposed a "State of Siege" which was followed by heightened counterinsurgency measures. His government committed serious human rights violations and used state terrorism in its war against the guerrillas including government sponsored "death squads". Security forces regularly detained, disappeared, tortured and extrajudicially executed political opponents, student leaders, suspected guerrilla sympathizers and trade unionists. Arana's government received large-scale military support from the United States including weapons, technical support and military advisors. The Guatemalan Human Rights Commission estimated that 20,000 Guatemalans were killed or "disappeared" under the Arana administration.

Carlos Arana, a freemason, was the first of the string of Institutional Democratic Party military rulers who would dominate Guatemalan politics in the 1970s and 1980s (his predecessor, Julio César Méndez, while dominated by the army, was a civilian).
He also served as the ambassador to Nicaragua.

Early life 

Arana was born in Barberena, in the department of Santa Rosa on July 17, 1918. He is the nephew of the former head of the Guatemalan armed forces, Francisco Javier Arana, who was one of the three members of the revolutionary junta that ruled Guatemala from 20 October 1944 to 15 March 1945 during the early part of the Guatemalan Revolution. Carlos Arana Osorio joined the military, becoming an officer. He was also an anti-communist politician and freemason. In 1955, he was appointed director of a Polytechnic School that was reopened by the government following the 1954 Guatemalan coup d'état.

Military career 

In 1964 and 1965, the Guatemalan Armed Forces began engaging in counterinsurgency actions against the MR-13 in eastern Guatemala. In February and March 1964, the Guatemalan Air Force began a selective bombing campaign against MR-13 bases in Izabal, which was followed by counterinsurgency sweeps in the neighboring province of Zacapa under the code-name "Operation Falcon" in September and October 1965. These operations were supplemented by increased U.S. military assistance. Beginning in 1965, the U.S. government sent Green Berets and CIA advisers to instruct the Guatemalan military in counterinsurgency (anti-guerrilla warfare). In addition, U.S. police and "Public Safety" advisers were dispatched to reorganize the urban security structures.

In a clandestine operation in March 1966, a total of thirty Partido Guatemalteco del Trabajo (PGT, Guatemalan Party of Labor) associates were seized, detained, tortured, and executed by the security forces. When law students at the University of San Carlos used legal measures (such as habeas corpus petitions) to require the government to present the detainees at court, some of the students were "disappeared" in turn. These "disappearances" became notorious as one of the first major instances of mass forced disappearance in Latin American history. The use of this tactic was augmented dramatically after the inauguration of President Julio César Méndez Montenegro, who – in a bid to placate and secure the support of the military establishment – gave it carte blanche to engage in "any means necessary" to pacify the country.

With the explicit authorization of the Mendez administration and increased military aid from the United States, the army – accompanied by militarized police units – mounted a large pacification effort in the departments of Zacapa and Izabal in October 1966. This campaign, dubbed "Operation Guatemala," was put under the supervision of Colonel Carlos Arana Osorio, with guidance and training from 1,000 US Green Berets.

Under Colonel Arana's jurisdiction and in the city, military strategists armed and fielded various paramilitary death squads to supplement regular army and police units in clandestine terror operations against the FAR's (Rebel Armed Forces) civilian support base. Personnel, weapons, funds and operational instructions were supplied to these organizations by the armed forces. The death squads operated with impunity – permitted by the government to kill any civilians deemed to be either insurgents or insurgent collaborators. The paramilitaries or "commissioners" who comprised the clandestine terrorist groups organized by the army were primarily right-wing fanatics with ties to the MLN, founded and led by Mario Sandoval Alarcón, a former participant in the 1954 coup. By 1967, the Guatemalan army claimed to have 1,800 civilian paramilitaries under its direct control.  One of the most notorious death squads operating during this period was the MANO, also known as the Mano Blanca ("White Hand"); initially formed by the MLN as a paramilitary front in 1966 to prevent President Méndez Montenegro from taking office, the MANO was quickly taken over by the military and incorporated into the state's counter-terror apparatus. The members of the MANO were largely army officers, and the organization received funding from wealthy landowners. It also received information from military intelligence.

Observers estimate that government forces killed or "disappeared" as many as 15,000 civilians in three years of the Mendez presidency. Amnesty International cited estimates that 3,000 to 8,000 peasants were killed by the army and paramilitary organizations in Zacapa and Izabal under Colonel Arana between October 1966 and March 1968. Other estimates put the death toll at 15,000 in Zacapa alone during the Mendez period. The victims included guerrilla sympathizers, peasants, labor union leaders, intellectuals, students, and other vaguely defined "enemies of the government." Some observers referred to the policy of the Guatemalan government as "White Terror" -a term previously used to describe similar periods of anti-communist mass killing in countries such as Taiwan and Spain.

The growth of government-sponsored paramilitarism and the government's use of "any means necessary" resulted in the opposition increasing its level of resistance to ensure its survival. The "White Terror" (which led to the destruction of the FAR's ladino peasant base in the eastern provinces) caused the MR-13 to retreat to Guatemala City. There, the MR-13 began to engage in selective killings of members of the security forces as well as U.S. military advisors. The insurgents assassinated the American ambassador to Guatemala, John Gordon Mein, in 1968, and the German ambassador to Guatemala, Karl Von Spreti, in 1970.

Presidency (1970–1974) 

In July 1970, with support from the Army, masonic colonel Carlos Arana Osorio assumed the presidency. He was the first of the string of Institutional Democratic Party military rulers who dominated Guatemalan politics in the 1970s and 1980s (his predecessor, Julio César Méndez, while dominated by the army, was nominally a civilian). Arana had served as the ambassador to Nicaragua during the Somoza regime. In a speech, President Arana stated, "If it is necessary to turn the country into a cemetery in order to pacify it, I will not hesitate to do so." Despite minimal armed insurgent activity at the time, Osorio imposed a "State of Siege" in November 1970. During the "State of Siege," the Osorio regime imposed a daily curfew from 9:00PM to 5:00AM, during which time all vehicle and pedestrian traffic—including ambulances, fire engines, nurses, and physicians—were forbidden throughout the national territory.

The "State of Siege" was accompanied by increased government repression in the form of abductions, tortures, forced disappearances and extrajudicial killings. A January 1971 secret bulletin of the U.S. Defense Intelligence Agency detailed how Guatemalan security forces "quietly eliminated" hundreds of suspected "terrorists and bandits" in the Guatemalan countryside. Though repression continued in the countryside, the "White Terror" of the Arana period was mostly urban and directed against the vestiges of the insurgency which existed primarily in the city. High government sources were cited at the time by foreign journalists as acknowledging 700 executions by security forces or paramilitary death squads in the first two months of the "State of Siege". According to Amnesty International and domestic human rights organizations such as 'Committee of Relatives of Disappeared Persons', over 7,000 civilian opponents of the security forces were 'disappeared' or found dead in 1970 and 1971, followed by an additional 8,000 in 1972 and 1973.

In October 1971, over 12,000 students at the University of San Carlos of Guatemala went on a general strike to protest the killing of students by the security forces; they called for an end to the "state of siege." On 27 November 1971, the Guatemalan military responded to the upheaval with an extensive raid on the main campus of the university seeking cached weapons. It mobilized 800 army personnel, as well as tanks, helicopters and armored cars, for the raid. They conducted a room-to-room search of the entire campus but found no evidence or supplies.

The "State of Siege" remained in effect until the end of 1972, when the Osorio regime announced the military defeat of the insurgency. The end of the "State of Siege" coincided with the forced disappearance of much of the PGT's central committee. In the period between January and September 1973, the Guatemalan Human Rights Commission documented the deaths and forced disappearances of 1,314 individuals by government death squads. The repression led to the Guatemalan government being characterized by international human rights organizations as one of the world's most repressive regimes. Amnesty International mentioned Guatemala as one of several countries under a human rights state of emergency, while citing "the high incidence of disappearances of Guatemalan citizens" as a major and continuing problem in its 1972–1973 annual report. The Guatemalan Human Rights Commission estimated 20,000 people killed or "disappeared" between 1970 and 1974 under the Arana government.

Under Arana, death squads were used not only as a counterinsurgency tactic, but as a tactic for fighting crime. In one incident on 13 October 1972, ten people were knifed to death in the name of a death squad known as the "Avenging Vulture." Guatemalan government sources told the U.S. Department of State that the "Avenging Vulture" and other similar death squads operating during the time period were a "smoke screen" for extra-legal tactics being employed by the National Police against non-political delinquents. Overall, as many as 42,000 Guatemalan civilians were killed or "disappeared" during the Mendez and Arana regimes.

Later life 

Following his presidency, he withdrew from political life and founded a political party, Central Auténtica Nacionalista (CAN). The party participated in several elections but had little impact. He died in December 2003.

References

Bibliography

External links 
Obituary (BBC News) 

Presidents of Guatemala
Ambassadors of Guatemala to Nicaragua
Guatemalan military personnel
People of the Guatemalan Civil War
1918 births
2003 deaths
National Liberation Movement (Guatemala) politicians
Institutional Democratic Party politicians
People from Santa Rosa Department, Guatemala
20th-century Guatemalan people
Guatemalan anti-communists
Guatemalan Freemasons